Wiembach is a river of North Rhine-Westphalia, Germany. It flows into the Wupper near Opladen.

See also
List of rivers of North Rhine-Westphalia

References

External links
Wiembach in the Leverkusen guide

Rivers of North Rhine-Westphalia
Rivers of Germany